Pseudodaphnella epicharis is a species of sea snail, a marine gastropod mollusk in the family Raphitomidae. It was first identified by Sturany in 1903 as Mangilia epicaris.

Description
The length of the shell is 4.6 mm, and the diameter is 2 mm.

Distribution
Pseudodaphnelle epicharis is documented as being distributed in the Red Sea.

References

 Sturany, R. "Gastropoden des Rothen Meeres. Expeditionen SM Schiff" Pola" iiKias Rothe Meer 1895/96 und 1897/98." ZooL Ergeb. Wien (1903): 1-75

External links
  Tucker, J.K. 2004 Catalog of recent and fossil turrids (Mollusca: Gastropoda). Zootaxa 682:1–1295.
 Dekker, H.; Orlin, Z. (2000). Check-list of Red Sea Mollusca. Spirula. 47 (supplement): 1–46
 Paolo G. Albano, Piet A.J. Bakker, Ronald Janssen, Anita Eschner, An illustrated catalogue of Rudolf Sturany's type specimens in the Naturhistorisches Museum Wien, Austria (NHMW): Red Sea gastropods; Zoosystematics and Evolution 93(1): 45-94 (18 Jan 2017)

epicharis
Gastropods described in 1903